Pallathur Venkatachalam Nandhidhaa (Tamil: பள்ளத்தூர் வெங்கடாசலம் நந்திதா) (born Apr 10, 1996) is an Indian chess player from the state of Tamilnadu, who holds the FIDE titles of Woman Grandmaster (WGM) and Woman International Master (WIM). She is the 17th Woman Grandmaster of India. She was part of 30 member Indian Chess Olympiad team which participated in 44th Chess Olympiad in Chennai, the capital city of Tamil Nadu, India from 28 July to 9 August 2022. She has recently won an individual Gold in Asian Chess Championship held at New Delhi on 3 November 2022. She scored an unbeaten and impressive 7.5/9 to clinch the title, thereby also qualifying for the Women's Chess World Cup 2023.

Early childhood and education
Nandhidhaa was born on 10 April 1996 in Sankagiri in the Indian state of Tamilnadu. She is an alumnus of College of Engineering, Guindy, Anna University, Chennai. She earned her Engineering seat by topping the sports quota. She holds a bachelor's degree in Electronics and Communication Engineering (2013–17). On 20 Aug 2021, she married her childhood friend and college-mate who is an Indian Army Officer.

Career
Nandhidhaa P V started her professional career in 2005. She won the Gold medal at the National Level Chess Championship (Under 11 Girls) held at Calicut in 2007. She won silver medal in the U-20 World Junior Chess Championship, in 2016 held at Bhubaneswar, Odisha, India. She won bronze medal in U-14 World Youth Chess Championship held at Halkidiki, Greece in 2010.
In October 2020, she was part of the Indian women chess team along with Vaishali Rameshbabu, Padmini Rout , Bhakti Kulkarni, Mary Ann Gomes which won the Asian Nations (Regions) Online Chess Championship 2020 organised by FIDE. The team won the gold medal for India out of 31 Asian countries participated.

As on Mar 2022, her Elo Rating is 2380 which is also her peak rating till date and is ranked 5th among Indian women chess players. In November 2022, she won the Gold medal at Asian Chess Championship held in New Delhi which qualified her for the Women's Chess World Cup 2023 in Baku.

Achievements

Gallery

References

External links

1996 births
Living people
Chess woman grandmasters
Indian female chess players
Sportswomen from Tamil Nadu
21st-century Indian women
21st-century Indian people
Tamil sportspeople